Albert L. Sutton (December 7, 1933 – October 20, 2022) was an American human rights activist, dedicated to ending the ongoing racist genocide in Sudan. He founded African Freedom Coalition with charter members David Livingstone Smith and Molefi Asante. He was a physician who retired from medicine in 1985, after becoming a whistleblower at the hospital of his employment.

Sutton died on October 20, 2022, at the age of 88.

References

External links 
 

1933 births
2022 deaths
Activists from New Rochelle, New York
American documentary filmmakers
American male actors